Icelandic Geographic was a magazine about the nature and people of Iceland, founded by Thordis Hadda Yngvadottir and Ketill Sigurjonsson. The magazine was published between 2002 and 2005.

History and profile
The first issue of Icelandic Geographic was published in August 2002. The magazine was part of Polar Publishing. It organized and hosted the "coolest" Travel Summit on the Planet; an international literary and photographic travel-event, held in Reykjavík in 2005.

The speakers and panelists at the Travel Summit were: Faith D'Aluisio (author and television news producer), Keith Bellows (Editor-in-chief of National Geographic Traveler and Vice President of National Geographic), Tim Cahill (travel writer and first editor of Outside Magazine), Annie Griffiths Belt (National Geographic photographer), Dan Hayes (editor of CNN Traveller), Rudy Maxa (host and co-executive producer of "Smart Travels"), Peter Menzel (photojournalist), Tim Moore (writer),  Maureen and Tony Wheeler (founders of Lonely Planet), Thora Arnorsdottir (journalist), Ragnar Axelsson (photographer), Ari Trausti Guðmundsson (geophysicist and mountaineer), Unnur Jokulsdóttir (writer and world-navigator), Joseph Kultgen (co-founder of TrekShare.com), David Leffman (photographer and travel writer), and Soren Sattrup (Editor-in-chief of the Danish Politiken guidebooks).

References

2002 establishments in Iceland
2005 disestablishments in Iceland
Defunct magazines published in Iceland
Environmental magazines
Geographic magazines
Magazines established in 2002
Magazines disestablished in 2005